The Tahtali-Jami Mosque is located in Bakhchisaray, Crimea. In  means "wooden mosque".

History
The mosque was built in 1707 by Khan Sultan Beck who married the daughter of Selim I Giray. It is the oldest mosque in the city and can be seen from almost any point of Bakhchisaray. It was originally constructed with wooden planks which were later closed in by stone blocks and masonry walls. The roof of the mosque is covered with clay tiles.

See also
 Religion in Crimea
List of mosques in Russia
List of mosques in Europe

Notes

Mosques in Bakhchysarai
Religious buildings and structures completed in 1707
18th-century mosques
Ottoman mosques
1707 establishments in the Crimean Khanate
Cultural heritage monuments of federal significance in Crimea